Bredo Wass (15 February 1903 – 2 February 1992) was a Norwegian footballer. He played in one match for the Norway national football team in 1926.

References

External links
 

1903 births
1992 deaths
Norwegian footballers
Norway international footballers
Place of birth missing
Association footballers not categorized by position